Not Worth a Fig is a 2009 Turkish drama film written and directed by Selda Çiçek based on a true story about a woman unhappily married to her late sister's husband.

Synopsis 
The plot focuses on one day in the life of a family and is centred on Heda, who is unhappily married to her late sister's husband. At the same time, Heda's mother Cemile is suffering from ever-deepening depression but no one even notices...or cares a fig.

Release

General release 

Festival screenings 
 16th London Turkish Film Festival (November 4–18, 2010)

See also
 2009 in film
 Turkish films of 2009

References

External links
 

2009 drama films
2009 films
Films set in Turkey
Turkish drama films
2000s Turkish-language films